The 2021 Ligue de Football de Saint Pierre et Miquelon is the 36th season of top-division football in Saint Pierre and Miquelon. Three clubs competed in the league: AS Saint Pierraise, A.S. Miquelonnaise and A.S. Ilienne Amateur. The 4-month season kicked off on 26 May with a match between ASSP and Asia. ASSP won 3–0. In the second match of the season ASM defeated ASSP 3–1. The final match of the season is scheduled for 18 September 2021. Miquelonnaise clinched the championship after a 5–0 victory over Saint Pierraise in Match 20.

Clubs

Overall table

Matches

Coupe Agricole Eco

A.S. Miquelonnaise won the Coupe Agricole Eco.

Coupe CCAS EDF

A.S. Miquelonnaise won the Coupe CCAS EDF.

Coupe Taxi Tan

Coupe Rotary Club

A.S. Miquelonnaise won the Coupe Rotary Club.

Goalscorers

References 

Ligue de Football de Saint Pierre et Miquelon seasons
Saint Pierre and Miquelon
Prem